Mohamed Ali Abdiaziz (born 3 April 1992) is a Somali former footballer.

Career statistics

International

International goals
Scores and results list Somalia's goal tally first.

References

1992 births
Living people
Association football forwards
Somalian footballers
Somalia international footballers
Place of birth missing (living people)